Marengo Township may refer to the following places in the United States:

 Marengo Township, McHenry County, Illinois
 Marengo Township, Iowa County, Iowa
 Marengo Township, Michigan

Township name disambiguation pages